Kencho is a town in Gasa District in northwestern Bhutan.

References

External links
Satellite map at Maplandia.com

Populated places in Bhutan